Flug der Dämonen (German for "Flight of the Demons") is a Bolliger & Mabillard Wing Coaster at the Heide Park Resort amusement park located in Soltau, Lower Saxony, Germany. The attraction officially opened to the public on March 29, 2014.

History
During the 2012 season, the Wildwasserbahn 2 was completely dismantled. Before that there were a few speculations about a new rollercoaster on the place of the Wildwasserbahn 2. In the 2013 season of the park, the coaster was announced in late summer, but before that, the themepark announced the new ride as follows: "It's big. It's fast. It comes. Closer and closer and closer. Premiere for Germany 2014. Here at Heide Park Resort.". On August 18, 2013, one day before Heide Park Resorts' 35th birthday, the park announced some details about the new ride to the media. The park also put up a website saying that the full details of the ride will be announced in the morning of August 19, 2013. On this website were construction updates and other stuff about Flug der Dämonen. The name of the new Wing Coaster was announced on January 8, 2014. It officially opened to the public on March 29, 2014.

Ride experience

After being dispatched from the station, the train makes a right hand turn, entering the  lift hill. Upon reaching the top of the lift hill, the train enters the first element of the roller coaster, a Dive Drop. This element is similar to the Dive Drop's found on X-Flight (Six Flags Great America) at Six Flags Great America, The Swarm at Thorpe Park, GateKeeper at Cedar Point and consists of the train rotating 180 degrees into an upside down position before descending back to the ground. During this drop, the train reaches its maximum speed of 62 miles per hour (100 km/h). Next, the train enters a camelback hill where riders experience the feeling of weightlessness. Upon exiting the hill, the train immediately enters an Immelmann loop. Next, the train goes through a Corkscrew, followed by a left-handed 270-degree downward helix. The next element is a new element called a Demonic Knot, it consists of a combination of an inclined Dive Loop followed  by an inclined Immelmann Loop. The train then enters a 315-degree left hand turn leading into the final brake run.

Characteristics

Track
The track is white and the supports are dark green.

Trains
Flug der Dämonen operates with two open-air steel and fiberglass trains, each with six cars of four seats each, with two on each side of the track. Each train holds 24 riders and the ride has a capacity of about 1,060 riders per hour. Because the seats are on the side of the track, a cantilevered steel arm is used to support the wings.

The trains are painted black and white. The front of each train is shaped to resemble the head of a demon. It was designed by German graffiti artist Markus Genesius.

References

External links

 
 

Heide Park
Roller coasters introduced in 2014
2014 establishments in Germany